This is a list of the seasons completed by the Arizona Wildcats men's basketball team from their first season in 1904 to present.

History   

† Arizona vacated all tournament wins and 2017, 2018 titles due to NCAA penalty (Arizona’s revised all-time tournament record - 32-15)

Season-by-season records
The following is a list of Arizona Wildcats men's basketball seasons, with records and notable accomplishments.

  

  Arizona finished with a 22–7 overall record for the 1998–99 season, but the NCAA later vacated Arizona's appearance in the NCAA Tournament, resulting in an official season record of 22–6.
  Arizona finished with a 19–15 overall record and an 8–10 record in Pac-10 play for the 2007–08 season, but NCAA later vacated all of Arizona's 19 wins and its NCAA Tournament appearance, resulting in an official season record of 0–14.
  Arizona finished with a 32–5 overall record and an 16–2 record in Pac-12 play for the 2016–17 season, but NCAA later vacated all of Arizona's 32 wins, its regular & conference season title, NCAA Tournament appearance, resulting in an official season record of 0–5 and 0–2 in conference play.
  Arizona finished with a 27–8 overall record and an 14–4 record in Pac-12 play for the 2017–18 season, but NCAA later vacated 18 wins, its regular & conference season title, NCAA Tournament appearance, resulting in an official season record of 9–8 and 3–4 in conference play.

Postseason playoff results
The NCAA tournament started in 1939 and the number of teams invited to participate has expanded a number of times over the years. Between 1939 and 1950 the tournament had only eight teams, and then between 1951 and 1974 the tournament varied between 16 teams and 25 teams.  The tournament has continued to expand over the years, and there are now 65 teams that make it into the tournament.

The National Invitation Tournament, meanwhile, began in 1938 with only 6 teams. In 1941 the tournament was expanded to include 8 teams, in 1949 the tournament was again expanded to 12 teams, then 14 teams in 1965, 16 teams in 1968, 24 teams in 1979, 32 teams in 1980, and 40 teams from 2002 through 2006. The tournament reverted to 32 teams for 2007.

References

External links 

 
Arizona
Arizona Wildcats basketball